Arena Football League on ESPN was a presentation of the Arena Football League with games airing on ESPN, ESPN2, ESPNEWS, ESPN3 and ESPN Deportes. As with all other sports broadcasting on the ESPN family of networks, all Arena Football games had aired on The WatchESPN App.  It was previously aired from 1987 until 2002 and then again from 2007 until 2008. When the league folded in 2019, the contract was over.

History

1987–1988, 1992–2002
ESPN was the original broadcaster for Arena Football games, showing games live in the league's first two seasons, 1987 and 1988. ESPN signed a six-year contract with the AFL in 1987, but was given the option to opt out of the contract if they were not getting the rating they wanted.

Partially because of turmoil within the league itself, ESPN did not broadcast Arena Football again until 1992, when they broadcast six games and the ArenaBowl on an overnight, tape delay basis.  Starting in 1993, ESPN started showing games live or at least not during overnight hours.

When ESPN2 was formed, the telecasts began to air more frequently on the new network. ESPN2 began televising a more standard schedule of Arena Football League regular season and playoff games from 1995–1999.

ESPN subsequently began televising AFL playoff games from 2000-02.

It originally had aired the inaugural ArenaBowl live in 1987, while ABC (under the Wide World of Sports umbrella) aired the ArenaBowl five consecutive years from 1998–02.

2007-2008 agreement
On December 19, 2006, ESPN and the Arena Football League agreed to a five-year agreement that includes extensive multimedia rights and a minimum of 26 televised games per season, beginning in 2007 and lasting until 2011. As part of the deal, ESPN purchased a minority stake, reportedly ten percent, in the AFL. The network will gain privileged financial information, but insists that it will not give the AFL more favorable coverage on shows like SportsCenter as a result.
ESPN televised a minimum of 17 regular-season games and nine playoff games—including a minimum of three Wild Card games, three Divisional Playoff games, both Conference Championships and the ArenaBowl on ESPN, ESPN2 and ABC. ESPN had an exclusive window for weekly Monday night prime time games on ESPN2. Both the season opener and ArenaBowl were on ABC, where three wild card games, two divisional games and one conference championship were on ESPN and the seventeen regular season Monday night games, one wild card game, two divisional games and one conference championship game was all on ESPN2.

2007 schedule
(All times Eastern)

*Schedule change

Controversy
Some AFL fans complained that the TV schedule “inequitably favored teams” such as the Philadelphia Soul, Chicago Rush, and Colorado Crush, teams whose ownerships include, respectively, Jon Bon Jovi, Mike Ditka and John Elway. 14 of the 17 ESPN games had at least Chicago, Philadelphia or Colorado playing. The Soul (whose part-owner and team president is former AFL on ESPN analyst Ron Jaworski) have appeared in seven of the 17 regular season games on ESPN platforms, more than any other team in the league. This criticism was also present when NBC went out of their way to not let some teams appear on their schedule.  In 2008, the Chicago Rush have nine regular season games on ESPN and ABC, while the 2007 Arena Bowl Champion San Jose SaberCats have just one, week one against the Chicago Rush, and the New York Dragons had 1, a 10:30 game versus the Colorado Crush. Other criticism includes the scheduling of games on various days and times, as opposed to a weekly AFL gameday.

2015–2019
ESPN returned to the AFL (in 2014) as broadcast partners, with weekly games shown on ESPN, ESPN2, ESPNEWS, and all other games available live and free on ESPN3.

Personalities
Former broadcasters of the AFL on ESPN and ABC included Mike Gleason, Gary Danielson, Brent Musburger, Merril Hoge, and Holly Rowe.

2007
Early on, ESPN said they would use "some prominent faces in the broadcast booth" and ended up going with the duo of Mike Greenberg and Mike Golic from ESPN Radio and ESPN2's Mike and Mike in the Morning for their number one team. The second team will consist of NFL Live'''s Trey Wingo and Mark Schlereth with the third being Ron Jaworski and Merril Hoge. On May 2007, Mark Jones replaced Jaworski, who focuses on his new Monday Night Football role. Jay Rothman, producer of Monday Night Football,  and Bryan Ryder will also produce the Monday night Arena Football games on ESPN2.  The announcements were made on January 16, 2007.ESPN MediaZone - A Resource for Media Professionals

The other play-by-play announcer used on playoff games is Bob Wischusen.

2008
Pasch, Wischusen, and Bentley returned to their respective roles while Marcellus Wiley and Shaun King joined as color commentators. The tandems of Greenberg-Golic and Wingo-Schlereth would not reprise their roles as play-by-play men in 2008.

The replays of classic Arena Football games that had aired on ESPN Classic in 2007 would also be dropped in 2008.

See alsoThe AFL on NBC''

References

2007 AFL on ESPN Schedule
AFL, ESPN enter into five-year agreement
Press Release: MIKE AND MIKE TO CALL ARENA FOOTBALL GAMES; Also Wingo-Schlereth and Jaworski-Hoge

External links
 AFL Official Website

ESPN
1987 American television series debuts
1988 American television series endings
1992 American television series debuts
2002 American television series endings
2007 American television series debuts
2008 American television series endings
2014 American television series debuts
American sports television series
ESPN original programming
ESPN2 original programming
American television series revived after cancellation